"Hylarana" chitwanensis is a species of frog in the family Ranidae endemic to Nepal. Its type locality is in the Chitwan National Park. Earlier reports from India are erroneous although it is likely to occur there.

"Hylarana" chitwanensis is a lowland species, occurring at altitudes less than  asl in the Himalayan foothills. Its natural habitats are terai grasslands, bushes and tropical Shorea forests. It is threatened by habitat loss caused by logging and dam construction. The Hylarana is distributed across tropical Australia, Southeast Asia, and Africa.

References

chitwanensis
Amphibians of Nepal
Endemic fauna of Nepal
Amphibians described in 1998
Taxonomy articles created by Polbot